Crossing of the Fathers is a historical river crossing of the Colorado River, in Kane and San Juan Counties, Utah.

The Crossing of the Fathers is named for the Spanish Franciscan priests or "padres" Atanasio Domínguez and Silvestre Vélez de Escalante, who first reported it during an expedition that forded the Colorado River there in 1776. The Colorado River crossing used by the Armijo Route of the Old Spanish Trail was established in 1828.

References

Pre-statehood history of Utah
Old Spanish Trail (trade route)
Landforms of San Juan County, Utah
Landforms of Kane County, Utah